De Laurentiis is an Italian surname. Notable people with this surname include:

 Aurelio De Laurentiis (born 1949), Italian film producer and president of S.S.C Napoli
 Dino De Laurentiis (1919–2010), Italian film producer
 Luigi De Laurentiis (1917–1992), Italian film producer
 Giada De Laurentiis (born 1970), Italian American chef
 Martha De Laurentiis (1954–2021), American film producer
 Raffaella De Laurentiis (born 1952), Italian film producer
 Suzanne DeLaurentiis (21st century), American film producer
 Veronica De Laurentiis (born 1950), Italian author
 Teresa de Laurentis (or de Lauretis; born 1938), Italian author and Professor of the History of Consciousness 
 Jeffrey DeLaurentis (born 1954), American diplomat and Chargé d'affaires ad interim in the U.S. Embassy of Havana

See also 

 De Laurentiis (disambiguation)

Italian-language surnames